The 2011 Sevens Grand Prix Series was the tenth edition of the European Sevens Championship.

Format 
The twelve best nations played 4 different tournaments in Lyon, Moscow, Barcelona and Bucharest. The team that finished with the most points was declared European Champion. The last two teams were relegated in Division A.

Schedule

Standings

Lyon

Pool Stage

Pool A

Pool B

Knockout stage

Bowl

Plate

Cup

Moscow

Pool Stage

Pool A

Pool B

Knockout stage

Bowl

Plate

Cup

Barcelona

Pool Stage

Pool A

Pool B

Knockout stage

Bowl

Plate

Cup

Bucharest

Pool Stage

Pool A

* Head-to-Head Russia beat England

Pool B

Knockout stage

Bowl

Plate

Cup

Player scoring

Most points

Most tries

New entries in 2012 

Because if its victory in Division A, Germany will play in Sevens Grand Prix Series in 2012. Scotland will also enter the competition in 2012. Romania and Moldova will play in Division A

References

External links 
 FIRA-AER Official Website
 Page of the competition
 Rugby Europe Sevens: Rugby7.com

2010
International rugby union competitions hosted by Russia
International rugby union competitions hosted by Romania
International rugby union competitions hosted by Spain
International rugby union competitions hosted by France
European
2010–11 in European rugby union
2011–12 in European rugby union
2010–11 in French rugby union
2011 in Russian rugby union
2010–11 in Romanian rugby union
2010–11 in Spanish rugby union